George Island is the second largest of the Speedwell Island Group in the Falkland Islands with a land area of . It lies south of Speedwell Island and south west of East Falkland, and is separated from Lafonia by Eagle Passage. However, the island is free of rats.

George and Barren Islands together are run as a sheep farm, the most southerly in the Falkland Islands. There is also tourism that is well managed.

References
 Stonehouse, B (ed.) Encyclopedia of Antarctica and the Southern Oceans (2002)

Islands of the Falkland Islands